Hexadecacarbonylhexarhodium is a metal carbonyl cluster with the formula Rh6(CO)16. It exists as purple-brown crystals that are slightly soluble in dichloromethane and chloroform.  It is the principal binary carbonyl of rhodium.

Discovery and synthesis

Rh6(CO)16 was first prepared by Hieber in 1943 by carbonylation of RhCl3·3H2O at 80–230 °C and 200 atm carbon monoxide with silver or copper as a halide acceptor.  Hieber correctly formulated the compound as a binary carbonyl, but suggested the formula Rh4(CO)11, i.e., CO/Rh ratio of 2.75. The correct formula and structure was subsequently established by Dahl et al. using X-ray crystallography.  The correct CO/Rh ratio is 2.66.

Relative to the original preparation, the carbonylation of a mixture of anhydrous rhodium trichloride and iron pentacarbonyl was shown to give good yields of Rh6(CO)16. Other compounds of rhodium are also effective precursors such as [(CO)2Rh(μ-Cl)]2 and rhodium(II) acetate:

3 Rh2(O2CCH3)4 + 22 CO + 6 H2O → Rh6(CO)16 +  6 CO2 + 12 CH3COOH

3 [(CO)2RhCl]2 + 4 CO + 6 Cu → Rh6(CO)16 + 6 CuCl

It also arises quantitatively by thermal decomposition of tetrarhodium dodecacarbonyl in boiling hexane:

Reactions
At least some of the CO ligands can be displaced by donor ligands.

Rh6(CO)16 catalyzes a number of organic reactions including hydrogenation and hydroformylation.

References

Carbonyl complexes
Organorhodium compounds
Chemical compounds containing metal–metal bonds